Susan Wood (1954–2018) was a Canadian artist and educator.

Biography 
Born in Saint John, New Brunswick and grew up in Amherst, Nova Scotia. She received a Bachelor of Fine Arts from Mount Allison University in 1967 before attending the 1976-1977 Banff Winter Studio Program. In 1981 she received a Master of Fine Arts from the University of Calgary.

Susan Wood was a founding member of Eastern Edge Gallery, St. John's, Newfoundland and Labrador. She taught at NSCAD from 1990 to 2012.

Career 
Susan Wood was known for drawings rooted in the principles of observational drawing on handmade Japanese papers (washi).

Collections 

 Owens Art Gallery, Mount Allison University 
 Mount Saint Vincent University Art Gallery 
 NS Art Bank

Major exhibitions & awards 

 Member of the Royal Canadian Academy of Arts
 Recipient of grant awards from the Canada Council, the Newfoundland and Labrador Arts Council and the Nova Scotia Arts Council.
 Touring Solo Exhibition: Taxonomies (1999)
 Touring Solo Exhibition: Earth Skins at Mount Saint Vincent University Art Gallery (August 23 – October 2, 2011), Owens Art Gallery, Mount Allison University (January 13 – February 26, 2012), Acadia University Art Gallery (June 18 – August 11, 2012), The Rooms Provincial Art Gallery (September 8 – November 18, 2012).

References

Further reading 
 Review: Susan Wood – Earth Skins Vie Des Arts n°226 – Printemps 2012
 Catalogue: Susan Wood Earth Skins
 

1954 births
2018 deaths
Artists from Nova Scotia
Artists from Saint John, New Brunswick
Canadian art educators
Mount Allison University alumni
People from Amherst, Nova Scotia
University of Calgary alumni
20th-century Canadian women artists
21st-century Canadian women artists